The 2001 Individual Long Track/Grasstrack World Championship was the 31st edition of the FIM speedway Individual Long Track World Championship.

The world title was won by Gerd Riss of Germany for the fourth time.

Venues

Final Classification

References 

2001
Motorsport in England
Speedway competitions in France
Speedway competitions in Germany
Sports competitions in England
Long